Collagen alpha-3(VI) chain is a protein that in humans is encoded by the COL6A3 gene. This protein is an alpha chain of type VI collagen that aids in microfibril formation. As part of type VI collagen, this protein has been implicated in Bethlem myopathy,  Ullrich congenital muscular dystrophy (UCMD), and other diseases related to muscle and connective tissue.

Structure 

This gene encodes the alpha 3 chain, one of the three alpha chains of type VI collagen, a beaded filament collagen found in most connective tissues. The alpha 3 chain of type VI collagen is much larger than the alpha 1 and 2 chains. This difference in size is largely due to an increase in the number of subdomains, similar to von Willebrand Factor type A domains, found in the amino terminal globular domain of all the alpha chains. In addition to the full length transcript, four transcript variants have been identified that encode proteins with N-terminal globular domains of varying sizes.

Function 

The  alpha 3 type VI chain has been shown to bind extracellular matrix proteins, an interaction that explains the importance of this collagen in organizing matrix components. Microfibril formation has been traced to interactions between its N-terminal subdomain N5 and its C-terminal C5 domain in adjacent type VI collagen monomers.

Clinical significance 
Mutations in the type VI collagen genes are associated with Bethlem myopathy and  Ullrich congenital muscular dystrophy (UCMD). Typically, both Bethlem myopathy and autosomal recessive UCMD patients are heterozygous for mutations in the three type VI collagen alpha chains, but only the former exhibit symptoms. Of the three alpha chains, COL6A3 mutations contribute to only 18% of the Bethlem myopathy and UCMD cases. A study on UCMD mutations by Zhang et al found only one non-pathogenic mutation in COL6A3. Nonetheless, knockdown of mutant COL6A3 in patient fibroblast cells using siRNA has successfully improved cellular deposition of type VI collagen in autosomal dominant UCMD, and may become a promising treatment for it.
Though high expression levels of COL6A3 have been correlated with obesity and diabetes in mice, this relationship was not observed in humans.
Other disorders involving muscle and connective tissue include weakness, joint laxity and contractures, and abnormal skin.

References

Further reading

External links 
  GeneReviews/NCBI/NIH/UW entry on Congenital Muscular Dystrophy Overview

Collagens